Chloric acid, HClO3, is an oxoacid of chlorine, and the formal precursor of chlorate salts. It is a strong acid (pKa ≈ −2.7) and an oxidizing agent.

Properties
Chloric acid is thermodynamically unstable with respect to disproportionation.

Chloric acid is stable in cold aqueous solution up to a concentration of approximately 30%, and solution of up to 40% can be prepared by careful evaporation under reduced pressure. Above these concentrations, chloric acid solutions decompose to give a variety of products, for example:
8 HClO3 → 4 HClO4 + 2 H2O + 2 Cl2 + 3 O2
3 HClO3 → HClO4 + H2O + 2 ClO2

Hazards
Chloric acid is a powerful oxidizing agent. Most organics and flammables will deflagrate on contact.

Production
It can be prepared by the reaction of sulfuric acid with barium chlorate, the insoluble barium sulfate being removed by precipitation:
Ba(ClO3)2 + H2SO4 → 2 HClO3 + BaSO4
Another method is the heating of hypochlorous acid, producing chloric acid and hydrogen chloride:
3 HClO → HClO3 + 2 HCl

See also
Chlorate
Hypochlorous acid
Chlorous acid
Perchloric acid
Oxidizing acid
Dichlorine pentoxide

References

Chlorates
Halogen oxoacids
Mineral acids
Oxidizing agents
Oxidizing acids
Hydrogen compounds